Kemal Başar (born 25 October 1963) is a Turkish theatre director, drama teacher and translator. He finished MSU State Conservatory Theatre Section in 1989 and joined Turkish State Theatres in the same year. He was the artistic director of Ankara State Theatre and founder and manager of Turkish State Theatres International Affairs Office.

He is well known in his country as the curator of international theatre festivals. He also holds seminars and workshops abroad, especially in Romania and Poland.

Plays directed

 Nothing / Evdokimos Tsolakidis / Sadri Alisik Theatre, Istanbul, Turkey
 Hamlet / William Shakespeare / Cef Tiyatro, Istanbul, Turkey
 Istanbul Efendisi / Musahipzade Celal / Sivas State Theatre, Turkey
 An American Man In Harput / Cevat Fehmi Başkut / Istanbul Municipality, Turkey
 Accidental Death of an Anarchist / Dario Fo / Teatrul de Arta Deva, Romania
 Paci / Burak Akyuz / Istanbul People's Theatre, Turkey
 Külhanbeyi Muzikali / Ulku Ayvaz / Bakirkoy Municipality Theatre, Turkey
 Avalanche / Tuncer Cucenoglu / İstanbul Municipality Theatre, Turkey
 Romeo and Juliet / William Shakespeare / İstanbul Municipality Theatre, Turkey
 Loving Hurrem / Can Atilla / Teatr Modjeska, Poland
 Dormitory Nr. 72 / Orhan Kemal / Sadri Alisik Theatre, İstanbul, Turkey
 Romeo and Juliet / William Shakespeare / Teatrul Tony Bulandra, Romania
 Romeo and Juliet / William Shakespeare / Van State Theatre, Turkey
 Time Of Your Life / William Saroyan / Ankara State Theatre, Turkey
 The Child Behind The Eyes / Nava Semel / Teatrul G.A. Petculescu, Romania 
 The Child Behind The Eyes / Nava Semel / Ankara State Theatre, Turkey 
 Good Luck / Okday Korunan / Yalniztiyatro, Turkey 
 Nemrut / Gulsah Banda / Antalya State Theatre, Turkey  
 Red River / Tuncer Cucenoglu / Adana State Theatre, Turkey 
 Step Ballad / Unal Akpinar / Women Players, Turkey 
 The Bear In My Garden / Refik Erduran / Ankara State Theatre, Turkey 
 Nalinlar / Necati Cumali / Konya State Theatre, Turkey 
 Cactus Flower / Barillet and Gredy / Konya State Theatre, Turkey 
 Memets of Karalar / Cahit Atay / Sivas State Theatre, Turkey 
 Persians / Aeschylus / Bursa AVP Youth Theatre, Turkey 
 Three Tall Women / Edward Albee / Ankara State Theatre, Turkey

Translated plays

 Requiem / Hanoch Levin
 Messiah / Martin Sherman  
 Screwed / Zadok Zemach
 Her Leaves / Andreas Flourakis  
 Aliens With Extraordinary Skills / Saviana Stănescu  
 Nothing / Evdokimos Tsolakidis

Filmography 
 Aşkın Yolculuğu: Hacı Bayram Veli 2021
 Menajerimi Ara 2021 / Episode 35
 Dayı (film) 2020 
 Son Şaka (film) 2020
 Mucize Doktor 2020
 Naim Cep Herkülü (film) 2019 
 Eşkıya Dünyaya Hükümdar Olmaz 2016–2018
 Göl Zamanı (film) 2012 
 72. Koğuş (film) 2010 
 Signora Enrica (film) 2010
 Kurtlar Vadisi Pusu 2009 / Episodes 52–58
 Kod Adı Kaos 2006
 Kod Adı 2006
 Samyeli 2000
 Ah Bir Büyümesek 1995
 Yukarı Karakısık 1994

As voice actor 
 Sihirli Annem 2021 (Taci)

References

External links
Official website

Living people
1963 births
Turkish theatre directors
Turkish translators
People from Ankara
Mimar Sinan Fine Arts University alumni